Vicki Lensing (born June 21, 1957) is an American politician who served as a member of the Iowa House of Representatives from 2001 to 2021.

Education
Lensing graduated from West High School in 1975 and obtained her Bachelor of Arts from the University of Iowa in 1979.

Career
Lensing grew up around her grandparents' family business, Mott's Drug Store. She is a co-owner of Lensing Funeral & Cremation Service. Lensing was recognized as a Woman of Influence and received the Friend of the Family Farmer Award from the Iowa Farmers Union in 2009.

Lensing defeated Cathy Kern in a party primary in 2000, then won the general election against Republican Party candidate Paul Heyn. She won every subsequent general election unopposed. In 2020, Lensing was defeated in the Democratic primary by Christina Bohannan.

Lensing served on the Environmental Protection committee, the Judiciary committee, the State Government committee, the Government Oversight committee, and the Administration and Regulation Appropriations subcommittees.

Personal life
She is married to Rich Templeton. She was previously married to Michael Lensing, with whom she shares three children.

References

External links
 Representative Vicki Lensing - official Iowa Legislature site
 Representative Vicki Lensing - official Iowa General Assembly site
 Vicki Lensing State Representative - official constituency site
 

Democratic Party members of the Iowa House of Representatives
Living people
Women state legislators in Iowa
1957 births
University of Iowa alumni
Politicians from Iowa City, Iowa
21st-century American politicians
21st-century American women politicians